Gellio Sasceride (Sasserides) (3 March 1562 - 9 November 1612) was a Danish astronomer, professor and physician. The crater Sasserides on the Moon is named after him.  It lies near Tycho, named after Tycho Brahe.

Biography
Sasceride was born in Copenhagen, Denmark. He enrolled in the University of Wittenberg to study medicine, philosophy and natural sciences. In 1593 he received his doctorate in medicine in Basel. In 1603 he became a professor of medicine at the University of Copenhagen. In 1609 he was appointed rector of the University.

He worked as an assistant to Tycho Brahe after studying under him  from 1581 to 1587.  It is believed that the following words were written by Sasceride to Brahe: Quia adhuc aliquid superest spatii, quae sequuntur paucula, sic expetente typographo, subiungi permisi ex literis cuiusdam medicinae Doctoris, Patavii commorantis, ad quendam studiosum Danum.

Sasceride was also friends with Galileo. On 28 December 1592, after Galileo had begun his studies, he wrote a letter to Sasceride (at the time no longer Brahe's assistant) with the words Exordium erat splendidum ("[my] debut was excellent").  In 1590, Sasceride had sent to Galileo the only copy of a book until then found in Italy detailing the heliocentric system.

Notes
  J. L. E. Dreyer, Tycho Brahe: ein Bild wissenschaftlichen Lebens und Arbeitens im sechszehnten Jahrhundert (Karlsruhe: Druck und Verlag der G. Braun'schen Hofbuchhandlung, 1894), p. 277.

References

External links
 Le Opere (contains reference to Sasceride)
 Galileo Galilei

1562 births
1612 deaths
University of Wittenberg alumni
Rectors of the University of Copenhagen
16th-century Danish physicians
17th-century Danish physicians
17th-century Danish  astronomers
16th-century Danish astronomers
Scientists from Copenhagen
Expatriates of the Kingdom of Denmark in the Holy Roman Empire